Fahad Khalfan (Arabic:فهد خلفان) (born 21 August 1990) is an Emirati footballer who plays for Al-Taawon as a midfielder.

References

External links
 

Emirati footballers
1990 births
Living people
Al Wahda FC players
Al Shabab Al Arabi Club Dubai players
Fujairah FC players
Dibba FC players
Emirates Club players
Al Bataeh Club players
Al-Taawon (UAE) Club players
UAE First Division League players
UAE Pro League players
Association football midfielders